Jay James O'Brien (February 22, 1883 – April 5, 1940) was an American bobsledder who competed in the late 1920s and early 1930s. He won two medals at the Winter Olympics with a gold in the four-man event at Lake Placid, New York in 1932 and a silver in the five-man event at St. Moritz in 1928.  At 48 years old, he was the oldest Olympic champion.

O'Brien was also a jockey, and was head of the United States Olympic Bobsled Committee at the time of the 1932 Winter Olympics in Lake Placid. He died of a heart attack in 1940.

References

 Bobsleigh five-man Olympic medalists for 1928
 DatabaseOlympics.com profile
 Wallenchinsky, David. (1984). "Bobsled: Four-Man". In The Complete Book of the Olympics: 1896-1980. New York: Penguin Books. p. 560.

1883 births
1940 deaths
American male bobsledders
Bobsledders at the 1928 Winter Olympics
Bobsledders at the 1932 Winter Olympics
Olympic gold medalists for the United States in bobsleigh
Olympic silver medalists for the United States in bobsleigh
Medalists at the 1928 Winter Olympics
Medalists at the 1932 Winter Olympics
20th-century American people